Wayne Fereday (born 16 June 1963) is an English former professional footballer who played in the Football League as a winger for Queens Park Rangers, Newcastle United, AFC Bournemouth, West Bromwich Albion and Cardiff City. He was capped by England at under-21 level.

Fereday was born in Warley, now in the West Midlands county, and began his football career with Queens Park Rangers. He scored twice on his debut as a 17-year-old, on 19 August 1980 in a 4–0 home win over Bristol Rovers in the Second Division. Noted for his pace, he went on to play more than 200 games for QPR, and was capped five times for England under-21. He moved on to Newcastle United in 1989, followed by AFC Bournemouth, but had a difficult time at both. He finished his league career with West Bromwich Albion and Cardiff City, where his career was cut short by injury.

References

External links
 Stats and photo at Sporting Heroes

1963 births
Living people
People from Warley, West Midlands
English footballers
England under-21 international footballers
Association football wingers
Queens Park Rangers F.C. players
Newcastle United F.C. players
AFC Bournemouth players
West Bromwich Albion F.C. players
Cardiff City F.C. players
English Football League players